Mozolice Małe  is a village in the administrative district of Gmina Sieciechów, within Kozienice County, Masovian Voivodeship, in east-central Poland. 

References

External links
 
 

Villages in Kozienice County